Podlesie Kościelne  is a village in the administrative district of Gmina Mieścisko, within Wągrowiec County, Greater Poland Voivodeship, in west-central Poland.

Podlesie was a private village of Polish nobility, administratively located in the Gniezno County in the Kalisz Voivodeship in the Greater Poland Province of the Polish Crown.

During the German invasion of Poland, in September 1939, the Wehrmacht carried out a massacre of nine Poles in the village.

There is a historic wooden church of Saint Anne from 1712 in the village.

References

Villages in Wągrowiec County